The Hiram Ramsdell House, also called the Octagon House, is an historic octagonal house located at High and Perham streets in Farmington, Maine. Built in 1858 by mason Cyrus Ramsdell, it was added to the United States National Register of Historic Places on December 4, 1973.

Description and history
The Octagon House was inspired by the octagon house designs of Orson Squire Fowler. Fowler thought that a round shape was conducive to better air circulation and socialization. The Hiram Ramsdell House has an eight-sided glass cupola over the central staircase. The first floor has five rooms around the core while there are seven bedrooms on the second floor.

Cyrus Ramsdell occupied the house for 10 years before he sold the property to his brother Hiram Ramsdell who resided there until he died in 1903. The house became apartments in the 20th century and fell into disrepair. In 1912, Farmington Normal School (today the University of Maine at Farmington) principal Wilbert G. Mallett bought the house.

On February 26, 2012, the owner of the house, Deborah Mallett Cressall, died, and her family offered the Farmington Historical Society the chance to buy the house at a steeply reduced price. The Farmington Historical Society received a May 30, 2013 deadline, to buy the house and quickly began a money-raising campaign requiring $250,000 to buy the home. That money would also fund the renovations to the roof and drainage work.  The Farmington Historical Society acquired the house in May 2013.

See also
National Register of Historic Places listings in Franklin County, Maine

References

Houses on the National Register of Historic Places in Maine
Houses in Franklin County, Maine
Octagon houses in Maine
Farmington, Maine
Houses completed in 1858
National Register of Historic Places in Franklin County, Maine
Historic district contributing properties in Maine